Steve Brennan (3 September 1958 – 13 August 2015) was an English professional footballer who played as a midfielder in the Football League for Crystal Palace and Plymouth Argyle before moving into non-league football with Leatherhead.

Playing career
Brennan was born in Mile End, Greater London, and began his youth career at Crystal Palace where he was part of the successful youth squad which won the FA Youth Cup in 1977 and 1978. He signed professional terms in February 1976 and made his senior debut on 31 August 1976, in an away 1–3 defeat to Watford in the League Cup. His first Football League appearance was on 2 March 1977, in an away 2–3 defeat to Lincoln City, when he scored one of Palace's goals. Brennan made only one further appearance that season and one in 1977–8 before signing for Plymouth Argyle on 1 August 1978. At Plymouth, Brennan made only six appearances and moved into non-league football with Leatherhead in 1979.

Brennan died on 13 August 2015, aged 56.

References

External links

Brennan at holmesdale.net

1958 births
Footballers from Mile End
English footballers
English Football League players
Association football midfielders
Crystal Palace F.C. players
Plymouth Argyle F.C. players
Leatherhead F.C. players
2015 deaths